Sponsored by Sen. John W. Kern (D) of Indiana, the Kern Amendment amended the Clayton Anti-Trust Act of 1914 by forbidding a Director, officer, or employee of any Reserve Bank having resources in excess of $5,000,000 acting in any similar capacity in another bank; however, it allowed an officer of a FED member bank, with the consent of the Federal Reserve Board, to hold a similar post in two other banks provided they were not in substantial competition with the member bank. In essence, the amendment lessened the prohibition against interlocking directorates dictated by the Clayton Act originally scheduled to go into effect on Oct. 15th, 1916.

1914 in law
Legal history of the United States